The Coat of arms of Triballia ( or ) is a historical coat of arms attributed to medieval Serbia by various armorials, and is today depicted in several Serbian municipality coat of arms in Šumadija. The motif is of a severed (erased) wild boar's head with an arrow in its mouth or through its head.

The Triballi were an ancient tribe whose name was used as an exonym for the Serbs by archaizing Byzantine authors in the Middle Ages. The Triballian coat of arms depicts the head of a boar pierced by an arrow. In the Chronicle of the Council of Constance from 1415, the motif is used as the coat of arms of the Serbian Despotate and is recalled in one of Stefan Lazarević's personal seals. It was used for historical Serbia in numerous armorials dating between the 15th and 18th centuries. The Habsburg monarchy adopted it into their flag of Serbia (as claimants), one of the flags given to an honorary flag-bearer during the coronation of the Hungarian king, since 1563. It was adopted by Karađorđe into the seal of the Revolutionary Serbian government, alongside the Serbian cross.

Historical examples

Serbian municipalities

See also

Coat of arms of Serbia
List of coats of arms of Serbia
Serbian eagle
Serbian cross

References

Sources
 
 
 

Serbian historical coats of arms
Serbian heraldry
Coats of arms with boars
Ancient history of Serbia
Boars in heraldry